Duncan Colin Annan (August 10, 1895June 21, 1981) was a professional American football player who played running back for six seasons for the Chicago Tigers, the Toledo Maroons, the Hammond Pros, and the Akron Pros/Indians. He signed with the Toledo Maroons in September 1922. He attended Brown University, where he played as a halfback.

References

1895 births
1981 deaths
American football running backs
Akron Indians players
Akron Pros players
Chicago Maroons football players
Chicago Tigers players
Hammond Pros players
Toledo Maroons players
Players of American football from Chicago